Sommepy-Tahure is a commune in the Marne department in north-eastern France. It was formed in 1950 by the merger of the former communes Sommepy and Tahure.

See also
Communes of the Marne department

References

Sommepytahure